Sumbat I may refer to:

Sumbat I of Klarjeti (died 899)
Sumbat I of Iberia (died 958)